This is a list of notable people associated with Minnesota State University, Mankato.

Alumni

Arts and entertainment

Athletics

Business and leadership

Law, politics, government, and military

Faculty

References 

Minnesota State University, Mankato alumni
Minnesota State University people